The Armenian Mirror-Spectator is a newspaper published by the Baikar Association, in Watertown, Massachusetts.

Among others, Arthur Derounian (John Roy Carlson) wrote for it.

The Armenian Mirror
The origins of the newspaper goes to 1931. The original raison d'être for the newspaper was to create a vehicle to bridge the growing generation gap between Armenian-Americans since the 1920s. Thus, the Armenian Democratic Liberal Party (ADL) also commonly known as the Ramgavar Party determined at its 1931 convention to establish an English-language Armenian weekly as an organ to the party and to be called The Armenian Mirror alongside the Armenian-language daily newspaper and official organ Baikar that was being published since 1922.

The Boston-based Armenian Mirror published in Watertown, Massachusetts was launched on July 1, 1932, with Elisha B. Chrakian as the founding editor.  The Armenian Mirror was the first English language Armenian newspaper in the United States.

The Spectator
The Spectator was a New York-based English-language Armenian independent newspaper not affiliated with any Armenian political party. Founded in 1933, its editor in chief was John Tashjian.

The Armenian Mirror-Spectator
In 1939, with the onslaught of the World War II, New York's The Spectator merged into the Boston-based Armenian Mirror ceasing publishing from New York.

The resulting merger formed Armenian Mirror-Spectator that continued as an organ of the Armenian Democratic Liberal Party (ADL).

References

External links
 http://www.mirrorspectator.com/

Armenian-American culture in Massachusetts
Newspapers published in Massachusetts
Watertown, Massachusetts
Armenian Democratic Liberal Party
1939 establishments in Massachusetts